Nasheet Waits is an American jazz drummer.

Early life and career 

Waits is a New York native who has been active on the jazz scene since early in his life. His father, percussionist Freddie Waits, died when Waits was 18.

Before pursuing a music career, Waits studied psychology and history at Morehouse College in Atlanta. He also holds a degree from Long Island University in music. While he was studying at L.I.U, instructor Michael Carvin secured Waits a spot in the percussion ensemble M'Boom, started by his father (Freddie Waits) and drummer Max Roach in 1970.

Waits's longstanding projects include Jason Moran & The Bandwagon, a trio with Moran, Waits, and Tarus Mateen; Tarbaby, a trio with Eric Revis and Orrin Evans; and his band Equality.

Waits has recorded or performed with Fred Hersch, Antonio Hart, Joe Lovano, Jason Moran, Andrew Hill, Ron Carter, Tony Malaby, Bunky Green, William Parker, Eddie Gómez, Casimir Liberski, John Medeski, Kurt Rosenwinkel, Mark Turner, and Amir ElSaffar.

In 2012, Hurricane Sandy caused massive flooding in the basement Westbeth studio Waits had inherited from his father in 1989.

In 2020, his group Nasheet Waits By Sea, a quartet with Nduduzo Makhathini, Immanuel Wilkins, Rashaan Carter, opened the Winter Jazzfest’s Manhattan Marathon.

Selected discography

As a leader
 Equality (Fresh Sound Records, 2008)
 Between Nothingness and Infinity (Laborie, 2016)

As sideman 

With Ralph Alessi
 Baida (ECM, 2013)
 Quiver (ECM, 2016)

With Dave Douglas
 Spirit Moves (Greenleaf, 2009)
 United Front: Brass Ecstasy at Newport (Greenleaf, 2011)
 Rare Metal (Greenleaf, 2011)

With Antonio Hart
 For Cannonball and Woody (RCA/Novus, 1993)
 All We Need (Downtown, 2004)

With Tony Malaby
 Tamarindo (Clean Feed, 2007)
 Somos Agua (Clean Feed, 2014)
 Palomo Recio (Clean Feed, 2016)

With Jason Moran
 Facing Left (Blue Note, 2000)
 Black Stars (Blue Note, 2001)
 The Bandwagon (Blue Note, 2003)
 Same Mother (Blue Note, 2005)
 Artist in Residence (Blue Note, 2006)
 Ten (Blue Note, 2010)
 All Rise: A Joyful Elegy for Fats Waller (Blue Note, 2014)
 Thanksgiving at The Vanguard (Yes, 2017)
 Looks of a Lot (Yes, 2018)

With Armen Nalbandian
 Quiet As It's Kept (Blacksmith Brother Music, 2011)
 The Holy Ghost (Blacksmith Brother Music, 2018)
 Fire Sign (Blacksmith Brother Music, 2018)
 Live in Little Tokyo Vol. I (Blacksmith Brother Music, 2018)
 Live in Little Tokyo Vol. II (Blacksmith Brother Music, 2018)
 Ghosts (Blacksmith Brother Music, 2019)
 Live on Sunset (Blacksmith Brother Music, 2019)

With Tim Berne
 The Coandă Effect (Relative Pitch, 2020)
 Tangled (Screwgun, 2022)With Tarbaby Tarbaby (Imani, 2009)
 The End of Fear (Posi-tone, 2010)
 Ballad of Sam Langford (Hipnotic, 2013)
 Fanon (RogueArt, 2013)
 Dance Of The Evil Toys (Clean Feed, 2022)With others' Rob Brown, Unknown Skies (RogueArt, 2011)
 Avishai Cohen, Into the Silence (ECM, 2016), Cross My Palm with Silver (ECM, 2017)
 Steve Davis, Meant to Be (Criss Cross, 2004)
 Orrin Evans, Blessed Ones (Criss Cross, 2001)
 Eddie Gómez, Palermo (Jazzeyes, 2007)
 Bunky Green, Another Place (Label Bleu, 2004 [2006])
 Fred Hersch, Night and the Music (Palmetto, 2007)
 Andrew Hill, A Beautiful Day (Palmetto, 2002)
 Ethan Iverson, The Purity of the Turf (Criss Cross Jazz, 2016)
 Igor Lumpert, Innertextures live (Clean Feed, 2012)
 Christian McBride, Christian McBride's New Jawn (Mack Avenue, 2018)
 David Murray, Be My Monster Love (Motéma, 2013)
 Émile Parisien Sextet, Louise  (ACT, 2022)
 Luis Perdomo, Awareness (RKM, 2007)
 Mark Turner, Dharma Days (Warner Bros., 2001)
 Anthony Wonsey, Open the Gates (Criss Cross, 1999)
 Bojan Z, Transpacifik (Label Bleu, 2003)
 Yelena Eckemoff, I Am a Stranger in This World'' (L&H, 2022)

Sources
Drummerworld
Jazzpar

References

External links
 Official site

American jazz musicians
Living people
1971 births
Morehouse College alumni
Long Island University alumni
The New Jazz Composers Octet members
RogueArt artists